Mucusso is a town and commune in the municipality of Dirico, province of Cuando Cubango, Angola.

See also
 Mucusso National Park

References

Populated places in Angola
Communes in Cuando Cubango Province